Henry Robinson (11 March 1864 – 24 March 1931) was an Australian cricketer. He played six first-class matches for New South Wales between 1889/90 and 1892/93.

See also
 List of New South Wales representative cricketers

References

External links
 

1864 births
1931 deaths
Australian cricketers
New South Wales cricketers
Cricketers from Sydney